The TFF 1. Lig, officially known as Spor Toto 1. Lig for sponsorship reasons,  is the second level of the Turkish football league system. The league was founded in 2001 as the Turkish Second League Category A after the reorganization of the Second Football League, which was the second level of the Turkish league system between 1963 and 2001. The league was called Türk Telekom Lig A in the 2006–2007 season, and was renamed to TFF First League prior to the 2007–08 season. As of 16 January 2008 the league was renamed as Bank Asya 1. Lig. In April 2012 Bank Asya withdrew as sponsor of the league. During the 2012–2016 seasons the league was known under the terms of a sponsorship deal as the PTT 1. Lig. Nowadays the league is called the TFF First League once again.

Before the 2005–06 season, the top three teams were promoted to Süper Lig and the bottom three teams were relegated to the Turkish Second League Category B. Since the 2005–06 season through 2008–09, the top two teams are directly promoted to the Süper Lig, the teams finishing 3rd through 6th competed in a play-off. The third-placed team played a match with the sixth-placed team, while the fourth-placed team played against the fifth-placed team. The winners of both matches then played against each other to decide the third team that was promoted. In 2009–10 the third team was determined by play-off group games, in which the 3rd, 4th, 5th and 6th teams of normal season played in a one-game league system in a neutral venue. In 2010–11 play-off status changed again and elimination match system came back but this time on a two match (home and away) basis.

Current clubs

Winners and promoted clubs

Play-off era

Promoted clubs

1 Third teams were play-off winner.

Relegated clubs

See also
Süper Lig
TFF Second League
TFF Third League
Turkish Regional Amateur League
Turkish Amateur Football Leagues
Turkish Cup

References

External links
  Turkish Football Federation

 
Sports leagues established in 2001
2001 establishments in Turkey
2
Turk
Professional sports leagues in Turkey